Chikara (力 or 主税) is a masculine Japanese given name. When written in most forms of kanji, the name means strength, power, authority and other similar variations. Notable people with the name include:

, Japanese professional shogi player
Chikara Mizuhata, Japanese racing driver, see 2010 D1 Grand Prix series
Chikara Nakashita, Japanese swimmer, competed at the 1997 Summer Universiade
, Japanese politician
, Japanese wrestler

Fictional characters 

 Chikara Ennoshita (縁下 力), a character from the manga and anime Haikyu!! with the position of wing spiker from Karasuno High

Japanese masculine given names